The Other I (German: Das andere Ich) is a 1918 Austrian silent fantasy film directed by Fritz Freisler and starring Raoul Aslan, Fritz Kortner and Magda Sonja.

Cast
 Raoul Aslan as Fritz 
 Fritz Kortner as Professor 
 Magda Sonja as Therese

References

Bibliography
 Bock, Hans-Michael & Bergfelder, Tim. The Concise CineGraph. Encyclopedia of German Cinema. Berghahn Books, 2009.

External links

Austro-Hungarian films
1918 films
Austrian silent feature films
Films directed by Fritz Freisler
Austrian black-and-white films
1918 drama films
Austrian fantasy drama films
1910s fantasy drama films
Silent drama films